Solaro is a comune (municipality) in the Metropolitan City of Milan in the Italian region Lombardy, located about  northwest of Milan. It has a population of about 14.000.

Solaro borders the following municipalities: Saronno, Ceriano Laghetto, Bovisio-Masciago, Limbiate, Caronno Pertusella, Cesate.

References

External links
 Official website

Cities and towns in Lombardy